Halishahar Cantonment is a cantonment situated at Halishahar in Chittagong. This is one of 28 cantonments across Bangladesh.

Institution 
 Artillery Center and School
 Halishahar Cantonment Public School & College

References 

Cantonments of Bangladesh
Chittagong